Charles Reilly or Charlie Reilly may refer to:
Charles Nelson Reilly (1931–2007), American actor, comedian, director and drama teacher
Charles Herbert Reilly (1874–1948), major figure in 20th-century architecture in Britain
Charlie Reilly (1867–1937), American Major League Baseball player

See also
Charlie Reilley, baseball player